The School for Vanity is a 1783 comedy play by the British writer Samuel Jackson Pratt.

The original Drury Lane cast included Thomas King as Sir Hercules Caustic, John Palmer as Sighwell, James William Dodd as Lord Frolic, William Brereton as Valentine Onslow, Robert Baddeley as Secondhand, William Parsons as Alderman Ingot, Elizabeth Hopkins as Lady Blaze, Mary Bulkley as Widow Wherett and Elizabeth Farren as Ophelia Wyndham.

References

Bibliography
 Nicoll, Allardyce. A History of English Drama 1660-1900: Volume III. Cambridge University Press, 2009.
 Hogan, C.B (ed.) The London Stage, 1660-1800: Volume V. Southern Illinois University Press, 1968.

1783 plays
Comedy plays
West End plays
Plays by Samuel Jackson Pratt